Basehart is a surname. Notable people with the surname include:

Jackie Basehart (1951–2015), American actor
Richard Basehart (1914–1984), American actor, father of Jackie